The Hellfire Club is a 1961 film inspired by the historical Hellfire Club, Sir Francis Dashwood's infamous 'Gentlemen's' society of the 18th century. It starred Keith Michell and featured Peter Cushing in a small cameo as enigmatic attorney Mr Merryweather.

According to the film, the club was famed for its depravity, debauchery, and devil worship. Although not a Hammer Films production, there are visual similarities. The script was co-written by Jimmy Sangster, and co-stars Hammer regulars Miles Malleson and Francis Matthews.

Cast
Keith Michell as Jason
Adrienne Corri as Isobel
Peter Cushing as Merryweather
Peter Arne as Thomas
Kai Fischer as Yvonne
David Lodge as Timothy
Bill Owen as Martin
Miles Malleson as Judge
Martin Stephens as Jason as a Boy
Andrew Faulds as Lord Netherden
Jean Lodge as Lady Netherden
Francis Matthews as Sir Hugh Manning
Desmond Walter-Ellis as Lord Chorley
Denis Shaw as Sir Richard
Tutte Lemkow as Higgins

External links

 

1961 films
British historical adventure films
1960s historical adventure films
Films directed by Robert S. Baker
Films directed by Monty Berman
Films scored by Clifton Parker
Films shot at Pinewood Studios
Films set in the 1760s
Films with screenplays by Jimmy Sangster
1960s English-language films
1960s British films